The 2016 United States House of Representatives elections in Maine were held on November 8, 2016, to elect the two U.S. representatives from the state of Maine, one from each of the state's two congressional districts. The elections coincided with the 2016 U.S. presidential election, as well as other elections to the House of Representatives, elections to the United States Senate and various state and local elections. The primaries were held on June 14.

District 1

Democratic primary

Declared
Chellie Pingree, incumbent U.S. representative

Results

Republican primary

Declared
Mark Holbrook, professional counselor
Ande Smith, United States Navy veteran, attorney 

After a recount, Holbrook was declared the winner with a margin of 57 votes.

Results

General election

Polling

Endorsements

Results

District 2

Mike Michaud, the incumbent representative for the first district, did not run for reelection in 2014 so that he could run for Governor of Maine in the 2014 election. Republican Bruce Poliquin defeated Democrat Emily Cain in the 2014 election to succeed Michaud.

After the election, Cain indicated she was interested in running against Poliquin in 2016. In December 2014, Cain met with Nancy Pelosi, the Democratic Leader of the House of Representatives, to discuss her potential candidacy. On March 3, 2015, Cain announced that she would be running for the seat.

Bangor City Councilors Joe Baldacci and Ben Sprague were mentioned as potential Democratic candidates. Jeff McCabe, the Majority Leader of the Maine House of Representatives, indicated that he might run against Poliquin in 2016, but later said that he would not do so.

Troy Jackson, the former Majority Leader of the Maine Senate, who lost to Cain in the 2014 Democratic primary election, had said he might run as an independent candidate, but he elected to run for his former Senate seat instead.

Republican primary

Declared
 Bruce Poliquin, incumbent U.S. representative

Results

Democratic primary

Candidates

Declared
 Emily Cain, former State Senator and nominee for the seat in 2014

Withdrawn
 Joe Baldacci, Bangor City Councilor and brother of former Governor of Maine and U.S. Representative John Baldacci

Declined
 Troy Jackson, Democratic National Committee member, former State Senator, candidate for the seat in 2014 (running for State Senate)
 Jeff McCabe, Majority Leader of the Maine House of Representatives
 Ben Sprague, Bangor City Councilor

Endorsements

Results

Independents

Withdrawn
Mike Turcotte, adjunct professor at Eastern Maine Community College

Declined
 Troy Jackson, Democratic primary candidate for the seat in 2014 (running for State Senate)

General election

Polling

Results

References

External links
 U.S. House elections in Maine, 2016 at Ballotpedia
 Campaign contributions at OpenSecrets

Maine
2016
United States House